"Ain't No Man" is a song by British singer-songwriter Dina Carroll. After singing on two singles with British dance production duo Quartz, she was relaunched as a solo artist with the song, which was released in June 1992 as the first single from her debut album, So Close (1993). Lyrically it is sung from the view of a woman singing to her man, telling him that there ain't no man that makes her feel like he do. Carroll told in an 1992 interview, "We wanted an anthemic, memorable song. For some reason, Nigel [Lowis] brought up 'Ain't No Mountain High Enough', and that idea evolved into 'Ain't No Man'." The song was well received among music critics and peaked at number 16 in the UK charts, number 26 in the Netherlands and number 63 in Germany. A colorful music video was also produced to promote the single, directed by Pedro Romhanyi.

Critical reception
Jon O'Brien from AllMusic described the song as "smooth disco-pop". Larry Flick from Billboard felt that Carroll has a "wonderful, belting voice that deserves to be embraced in pop radio circles." He added that this track "slams mighty hard". Andy Beevers from Music Week called it "very classy and soulful". In an retrospective review, Pop Rescue declared it as "a lovely little piece of up-tempo light pop." Phil Shanklin of ReviewsRevues wrote that it has "the verve and drive of a Ce Ce Peniston hit", complimenting it as "a big song which needs a big vocal and Dina shines." 

Davydd Chong from the RM Dance Update stated "an absolute belter in the vocal department, and all others, the tune bounds along proudly, head held high, evoking the spirit of some mid-Seventies soul classic." Adam Higginbotham from Select noted it as "solid, tastefully-cut soul bleeding subtly into brisk garage beats." Johnny Dee from Smash Hits described it as a "luxury, jazzy, summertime wobbler that sounds a bit like a Burt Bacharach tune from the '60s." He added that it "canters along, sweetly splish-splashing" and is "absolutely gorgeous." In 2013, the song was picked as an Official Chart 'Pop Gem'. They called it a "stand by your man anthem" and "an upbeat testimony that true love really did conquer all".

Track listing
 12" single, Germany (1992)
"Ain't No Man" (Lowmac Mix)
"Ain't No Man" (Master Mix)
"Ain't No Man" (Mackmaster Mix)	 
"You'll Lose a Good Thing"

 CD single, Europe (1992)
"Ain't No Man"
"You'll Lose a Good Thing"

 CD single, UK & Europe (1992)
"Ain't No Man" (Lowmac 7") – 3:44
"Ain't No Man" (Lowmac 12") – 5:15
"Ain't No Man" (Master Mix) – 7:29
"You'll Lose a Good Thing" – 3:10

Charts

Weekly charts

Year-end charts

References

1992 debut singles
1992 songs
A&M Records singles
British dance-pop songs
Disco songs
Dina Carroll songs
Music videos directed by Pedro Romhanyi
Songs written by Dina Carroll
Songs written by Nigel Lowis